Tobago East is a parliamentary electoral district in Trinidad and Tobago, comprising the eastern part of Tobago. It is currently represented by Ayanna Webster-Roy of the People's National Movement.

This constituency was created by the Boundaries Commission prior to the 1961 Trinidad and Tobago general election. Although Tobago did not have a large enough voting population to justify the division, the Commission determined that it would be best represented by two Members of Parliament.

Members of Parliament 
This constituency has elected the following members of the House of Representatives of Trinidad and Tobago:

Election Results

Elections in the 2020s

References 

Constituencies of the Parliament of Trinidad and Tobago